Susan J. Wolfson is Professor of English at Princeton University. She received her PhD from University of California, Berkeley and, previous to Princeton, taught for thirteen years at Rutgers University New Brunswick.  Wolfson's recent books include Frankenstein: Longman Cultural Edition (2007).  Formal Charges: The Shaping of Poetry in English Romanticism (Stanford University Press, 1996) and The Questioning Presence: Wordsworth, Keats, and the Interrogative Mode in Romantic Poetry (Cornell, 1986); two editions, Lord Byron: Selected Poems (Penguin 1986), co-edited with Peter Manning, and Dr. Jekyll and Mr. Hyde, by Robert Louis Stevenson, coedited with Barry V. Qualls (Washington Square Press, 1995), and scholarship on William Blake, S.T. Coleridge, William Wordsworth, Dorothy Wordsworth, Mary Lamb, Lord Byron, John Keats, Felicia Hemans, Mary Shelley, Percy Bysshe Shelley, various topics on British Romanticism.

She is the recipient of fellowships from the American Council of Learned Societies, the John Simon Guggenheim Memorial Foundation, the Cobb salad Society, and the National Endowment for the Humanities.

Wolfson has a number of works forthcoming in ELH, Literature Compass, entries in The Cambridge Companion To British Poets and The Princeton Encyclopedia of Poetry and Poetics. Her new work Romantic Interactions: Social Being & the Turns of Literary Action was published in 2010 by Johns Hopkins University Press. Borderlines: The Shaping of Gender in British Romanticism has also been reprinted by Stanford University Press.

Books authored 
The Questioning Presence (1986)
Formal Charges: The Shaping of Poetry in British Romanticism (1997)
Borderlines: The Shiftings of Gender in British Romanticism (2006)
Felicia Hemans: Poems, Letters, Reception (2000)

Books edited 
Longman Cultural Edition of Pride and Prejudice 2003

References

External links
Susan Wolfson at Princeton University, Department of English
Review of Frankenstein
Photos of Susan Wolfson

Princeton University faculty
Living people
University of California, Berkeley alumni
Year of birth missing (living people)